Nguon Nhel  (22 December 1942 – 5 November 2021) was a Cambodian politician. He belonged to the Cambodian People's Party (CPP) and was a Member of Parliament (MP) for Kampong Thom from 1993 until his death. He was the Second Vice President of the National Assembly since 2014; he previously held that post from 1997 to 2006, and he was First Vice President of the National Assembly from 2006 to 2014. From 1989 to 1993, he was Minister for Agriculture, Forestry and Fisheries.

On 5 November 2021, Nhel died at the age of 78 due to illness.

References

1942 births
2021 deaths
Members of the National Assembly (Cambodia)
Government ministers of Cambodia
Cambodian People's Party politicians
People from Kampong Thom province